Beacom is a surname. Notable people with the surname include:

Colin Beacom (born 1937), English badminton player
Gary Beacom (born 1960), Canadian figure skater, choreographer, and author
Genevieve Beacom (born 2004), Australian baseball pitcher
Karl Beacom (1938–2015), Canadian lawn bowler
Mike Beacom, American sportswriter